Tantilla gracilis (flathead snake) is a species of snake of the family Colubridae.

Geographic range
The snake is found in the US states of Missouri, Texas, Kansas, Illinois, Oklahoma, Louisiana and Arkansas and in Mexico.

References 

Reptiles described in 1853
Reptiles of the United States
Reptiles of Mexico
Colubrids